Oleksiy Rudyka (7 June 1959) is a former professional Soviet football goalkeeper and coach.

He has a nephew Serhiy Rudyka who was Ukraine youth international and a twin brother Oleksandr Rudyka.

References

External links
 
"I tried to give away myself to football to the end..." Oleksiy Rudyka. Recollections («Я старался отдавать себя футболу до конца…». Алексей РУДЫКА. Воспоминания). FC Sevastopol (Russia). 23 August 2016.

1959 births
Living people
Footballers from Zaporizhzhia
Soviet footballers
FC Metalurh Zaporizhzhia players
SKA Odesa players
FC Khisar Shakhrisabz players
FC Torpedo Zaporizhzhia players
FC Chayka Sevastopol players
Soviet football managers
Ukrainian football managers
FC Chayka Sevastopol managers
Association football goalkeepers